Muro Muruni (possibly from in the Aymara spelling Muru Muruni) is a mountain in the Carabaya mountain range in the Andes of Peru, about  high. It is in the Puno Region, Carabaya Province, Coasa District. Muro Muruni lies southeast of the mountain Chullumpirini.

Its name derives from the Aymara muru truncated, the reduplication indicates that there is a group or a complex of something, -ni a suffix to indicate ownership.

References

Mountains of Peru
Mountains of Puno Region